Louis Disbrow (1876–1939) was an American racecar driver.

Life 
He was born on September 23, 1876 in Richmond Hill, Queens, New York. Disbrow came from a wealthy family.

He was indicted for the 1902 murders of Sarah "Dimples" Lawrence and Clarence Foster in Good Ground, but found not guilty at trial in 1903. He was then hired by a neighbouring family as a chauffeur mechanic for Joan Newton Cuneo, a early US woman racing driver. 

Disbrow raced in the first four Indianapolis 500s, with a best finish of 8th in 1913, and also in the 1910, 1911, and 1915 American Grand Prizes.  He died on July 9, 1939 at his home in Philadelphia, Pennsylvania.

Indy 500 results

References

1876 births
1939 deaths
Grand Prix drivers
Indianapolis 500 drivers
Racing drivers from New York City
People from Richmond Hill, Queens